Chunilal Karsandas Thakker (also Thakkar) (born 10 November 1943, Mander near Porbandar, Gujarat, India) is a retired judge of the Supreme Court of India.

Education and career 
After taking primary education at Mander and Madhavpur, Thakker graduated from a college in Junagadh and obtained an LLB (law) degree from a law college in Jamnagar. He also obtained an LLM degree from Gujarat University, and began practicing from 1968 in the High Court of Gujarat.

Thakker was appointed part-time Lecturer in Law in Sir L.A. Shah Law College, Ahmedabad, in 1970 and continued as such until he was elevated to Judge of the High Court of Gujarat on 21 June 1990. He was further promoted to Chief Justice of High Court of Himachal Pradesh, Shimla on 5 May 2000 and transferred as the Chief Justice of High Court of Judicature at Mumbai on 31 December 2001.

Thakker was appointed a judge of the Supreme Court of India on 7 June 2004.
He was also Acting Governor of the State of Maharashtra from July to October 2002.

Publications 
Thakkar has written several law books such as Lectures on Administrative Law (Students' Edition) and Code of Civil Procedure. His book on the Civil Procedure Code, 1908 published under the pen name of C.K. Takwani has remained a standard textbook for law students in India for the past 25 years. He revised Law of Writs by V.G. Ramachandran.

References

 Profile on website of Supreme Court of India

1943 births
Living people
20th-century Indian judges
21st-century Indian judges
Judges of the Gujarat High Court
Chief Justices of the Himachal Pradesh High Court
Chief Justices of the Bombay High Court
Justices of the Supreme Court of India
Gujarat University alumni
People from Porbandar district